The Fifth Federal Electoral District of the Federal District (V Distrito Electoral Federal del Distrito Federal) is one of the 300 Electoral Districts into which Mexico is divided for the purpose of elections to the federal Chamber of Deputies and one of 27 such districts in the Federal District ("DF" or Mexico City).

It elects one deputy to the lower house of Congress for each three-year legislative period, by means of the first past the post system.

District territory
Under the 2008 districting scheme, the DF's Fifth District covers the  northern portion of the borough (delegación) of Tlalpan (i.e., most of the urban sector of the borough.

Previous districting schemes

1996–2005 district
Between 1996 and 2005, the Fifth  District covered the northern  portion of the borough of Miguel Hidalgo.

Deputies returned to Congress from this district

LI Legislature
 1976–1979: Miguel Molina Herrera (PRI)
LI Legislature
 1979–1982: Juan Araiza Cabrales (PRI)
LII Legislature
 1982–1985: Miguel Angel Morado Garrido (PRI)
LIII Legislature
 1985–1988:
LIV Legislature
 1988–1991: Ramón Choreño Sánchez (PRI)
LV Legislature
 1991–1994:
LVI Legislature
 1994–1997: Francisco Martínez Rivera (PRI)
LVII Legislature
 1997–2000: Ignacio Arrieta Aragón (PRI)
LVIII Legislature
 2000–2003: Jesús López Sandoval (PAN)
LIX Legislature
 2003–2006: Francisco Javier Carrillo (PRD)
LX Legislature
 2006–2009: Maricela Contreras Julián (PRD)

References and notes

Federal electoral districts of Mexico
Mexico City